Christine of Hesse-Kassel (19 October 1578 – 19 August 1658) was a German noblewoman member of the House of Hesse and by marriage Duchess of Saxe-Eisenach and Saxe-Coburg.

Born in Kassel, she was the tenth of eleven children born from the marriage of William IV, Landgrave of Hesse-Kassel and his wife Duchess Sabine of Württemberg. She was probably named after both her paternal grandmother and aunt (by marriage Duchess consort of Schleswig-Holstein-Gottorp).

Life
In Rotenburg an der Fulda on 14 May 1598, Christine married John Ernest, Duke of Saxe-Eisenach as his second wife. On the occasion of the marriage Jacob Thysius wrote a special Epithalamium. Since her father had died in 1592, was her older brother Maurice, Landgrave of Hesse-Kassel, who took care of her trousseau. The dowry was retained until her Wittum (widow's seat) was negotiated. In the marriage contract was stipulated, in addition to her paternal, maternal and fraternal inheritance, an income from her future husband.

Christine was described as a learned and pious woman, who being married to a Calvinist prince was forced to renounce her Lutheran faith against her will. Her union was happy, but remained childless. She survived her husband by 20 years and during her long widowhood dedicated herself to pious foundations. Christine was extremely well versed in mathematics, history, astronomy, astrology and Nativitätstellerei. Because of her progressive deafness, in her last years she used an ear trumpet.

Christine died in Eisenach, aged 79. She was buried in the Georgenkirche, Eisenach; in her will, she left 6,000 guilders for the purpose of scholarship and alleviation of poverty.

Notes

References
Emil Rückert: Altensteins u. Liebensteins Vorzeit p. 71.
Christoph von Rommel: Geschichte von Hessen p. 313.
Johann Christian Friedrich Harless: Die Verdienste der Frauen um Naturwissenschaft, Gesundheits- und Heilkunde ... p. 157.
Johann Samuel Ersch: Allgemeine Encyclopädie der Wissenschaften und Künste in alphabetischer ... p. 244.

|-

|-

House of Hesse
House of Wettin
1578 births
1658 deaths
17th-century German people
Duchesses of Saxe-Eisenach
Daughters of monarchs